Miroslav Kalinov Marinov (born 7 March 2004) is a Bulgarian footballer who plays as a striker for Bulgarian First League side Botev Vratsa.

Club career
Born and raised in Vratsa, Marinov started playing football at the age of 8 for local football club Botev Vratsa. He has spent seven years at the clubs' academy before being promoted to the first team at the age of 15. He made his debut in a friendly against PFC Litex Lovech on 3 July 2019.
On 22 November 2020, he made his official First League debut, coming in as a substitute for Brazilian Tom against Cherno more Varna, becoming the youngest ever Botev Vratsa player to play in a competitive top division game at 16 years and eight months. 

Marinov was assigned to Botev's second team, competing in Third League where he has scored seven goals in the opening 13 matches of the 2020–21 season. At the end of 2020, he was voted in the divisions' best 11 by all teams' head coaches. He finished the season with ten goals in 17 games before being promoted full time to the first team.

In August 2021, at 17 years five months old, he became the youngest player to ever score a goal in the First League for Botev  Vratsa after hitting the target in a game against Tsarsko selo.

International career 
In September 2021, Marinov was called up to the Bulgaria U19 national team for the first time, making his debut in a friendly against Malta. He then appeared in the UEFA U19 Euro 2022 qualifiers against Bosnia-Herzegovina, Montenegro and Republic of Ireland.

Career statistics

Club

References

External links
 

2004 births
Living people
People from Vratsa
Bulgarian footballers
Association football forwards
First Professional Football League (Bulgaria) players
FC Botev Vratsa players